Golden Hill Cemetery is located at 5025 North 42nd Street in the North Omaha neighborhood of Omaha, Nebraska.

History
The Chevra B'nai Israel Adas Russia purchased the land as a Jewish cemetery in 1888.

The cemetery is part of the Orthodox Jewish community of Omaha. It is a small cemetery that takes up about one city block and is relatively full. A circular drive runs down the center of the cemetery.

Notable burials
 Rose Blumkin (1893–1998), the founder of the Nebraska Furniture Mart
 The cemetery also has graves for Jewish soldiers and officers from Omaha who were killed in World War I, World War II, and other wars

See also
 History of the Jews in Omaha, Nebraska
 List of cemeteries in Omaha
 History of Omaha

References

External links

 Beth Israel Synagogue (Omaha, NE) – cemetery contact
 International Jewish Cemetery Project at International Association of Jewish Genealogical Societies (IAJGS)
 JewishGen Online Worldwide Burial Registry (JOWBR) at JewishGen
 

Landmarks in North Omaha, Nebraska
Jewish cemeteries in Omaha, Nebraska
1888 establishments in Nebraska